Lakeshore Mall may refer to:
Lakeshore Mall (Florida), in Sebring, Florida
Lakeshore Mall (Georgia), in Gainesville, Georgia